Rue du Dahomey is a street in the 11th arrondissement of Paris.